Tigrayans are a Semitic-speaking ethnic group indigenous to the Tigray Region of northern Ethiopia. They speak the Tigrinya language, an Afroasiatic language belonging to the Ethiopian Semitic branch.

The daily life of Tigrayans is highly influenced by religious concepts. For example, the Christian Orthodox fasting periods are strictly observed, especially in Tigray; but also traditional local beliefs such as in spirits, are widespread. In Tigray the language of the church remains exclusively Ge’ez. Tigrayan society is marked by a strong ideal of communitarianism and, especially in the rural sphere, by egalitarian principles. This does not exclude an important role of gerontocratic rules and in some regions such as the wider Adwa area, formerly the prevalence of feudal lords, who, however, still had to respect the local land rights.

History

The majority of Tigrayans trace their origin to early Semitic-speaking peoples whose presence in the region may date back to at least 2000 BC, based on linguistic evidence (and known from the 9th century BC from inscriptions).A variant of the term Tigray, first appears in a 10th-century gloss to Cosmas Indicopleustes Indicopleustes, i.e. after the Aksumite period; according to this source one of the groups of the region were the "Tigrētai" and the "Agazē" (i.e. the Agʿazi) the latter being the Aksumites. The toponym Tigray is probably originally ethnic, the "Tigrētai" then meant "the tribes near Adulis". These are believed to be the ancient people from whom the present-day Tigray, the Eritrean tribes Tigre and Tigrinya are descended from. There is no indication that the term Tigray could be explained through Ge'ez gäzärä ("subdue"), with the meaning "the submitted" (in supposed contrast to the "free" Agaziyan linked with the rulers of Aksum).
A Portuguese map from the 1660 shows Medri Bahri consisting of the three highland provinces of Eritrea and distinct from Ethiopia.  That 16th century also marked the arrival of the Ottomans, who began making inroads in the Red Sea area. Bruce noted "They next passed the Mareb, which is the boundary between Tigre and the Baharnagash". 

By the beginning of the 19th century Henry Salt, who travelled in the interior of Ethiopia, divided the Ethiopian region into three distinct and independent states. These three great divisions (based arbitrarily on Language) are Tigre, Amhara, and the province of Shewa. Salt considered Tigre as the more powerful state of the three; a circumstance arising from the natural strength of the country, the warlike disposition of its inhabitants, and its vicinity to the sea coast; an advantage that allowed it to secure a monopoly on all the muskets imported into the country. He divided the Tigre kingdom into several provinces with the seat of the state, a region around Adwa, being referred as Tigre proper. The other Provinces of this kingdom includes Enderta, Agame, Wojjerat, Tembien, and Shire.

Demographics
Tigrayans constitute approximately 6.1% of the population of Ethiopia and are largely small holding farmers inhabiting small communal villages. The Tigrayans constitute the fourth largest ethnic group in the country after the Oromo, Amhara and Somali. They are mainly Christian and members of the Ethiopian Orthodox Tewahedo Church (approximately 96%), with a small minority of Muslims, Catholics and Protestants. The predominantly Tigrayan populated urban centers in Ethiopia are found within the Tigray Region in towns including Mekelle, Adwa, Axum, Adigrat, and Shire. Huge populations of Tigrayans are also found in other large Ethiopian cities such as the capital Addis Ababa and Gondar. 

The Tigrayans are, despite a general impression of homogeneity, composed of numerous subgroups with their own socio-cultural traditions. Among these there are the Agame of eastern Tigray, mentioned in the Monumentum Adulitanum in the 3rd century; the cattle herders in Humera; the egalitarian Wajjarat of south-eastern Tigray. There are also some immigrant Tigrayans in the neighbouring country of Eritrea as well as abroad in the United States, Canada, Australia, and Europe.

The decline of the Tigrayan population in Ethiopia was caused by the 1958 famine in Tigray, when over 100,000 people died. Later on, the Mengistu Haile Mariam-led brutal military dictatorship (Derg) used the 1983–1985 famine in Ethiopia as government policy (by restricting food supplies) for counter-insurgency strategy (against Tigray People's Liberation Front guerrilla-soldiers), and for "social transformation" in non-insurgent areas (against people of Tigray province, Welo province and such).  deliberately multiplied the effects of the famine left 300,000 to 1.2 million people death in Ethiopia from this famine. According to United States Agency for International Development in the fall of 1984, the hardest hit regions of the famine were Tigray, Wollo and Eritrea.

Language
Tigrayans speak Tigrinya as a mother tongue. It belongs to the Ethiopian Semitic subgroup of the Afroasiatic family. In Ethiopia, Tigrinya is the third most spoken language. Several Tigrinya dialects, which differ phonetically, lexically, and grammatically from place to place, are more broadly classified as Hamasien (Eritrean) or Tigray (Ethiopian) dialects. No dialect appears to be accepted as a standard. 
Tigrinya is closely related to Amharic and Tigre (in Eritrea commonly called Tigrayit), another East African Semitic language spoken by the Tigre as well as many Beja of Eritrea and Sudan.  Tigrinya and Tigre, though more closely related to each other linguistically than either is to Amharic, are however not mutually intelligible. Tigrinya has traditionally been written using the same Ge'ez alphabet (fidel) as Amharic and Tigre. It has also met with the linguistic difficulty of the Ge'ez script being a syllabic system which does not distinguish long vowels from short ones. While this works well for writing Tigrinya or Amharic, which do not rely on vowel length in words, it does complicate writing Tigre, where vowel length sometimes distinguishes one word and its meaning from another. The Ge'ez script evolved from the Epigraphic South Arabian script, whose first inscriptions are from the 8th century BC in Eritrea, Ethiopia and Yemen.

Religion

The daily life of Tigrayans are highly influenced by religion. Before the coming of Christianity, most Tigrayans followed a pagan religion with a number of deities, including the sun god Utu, and the moon god Almaqah. Some tribes however practiced Judaism. The most prominent polytheistic kingdoms was D’mt and early Aksum.

Christianity 
Christianity has been the predominant religion of Tigrayans since antiquity. Tigrayan Christians are mostly Oriental Orthodox with a Catholic and Pentay minority.

Islam
Tigrayan Muslims are virtually all Sunni, though a minority of Ahbash followers also exists. Today, the Muslim community is concentrated mainly in urban areas. Many Jeberti in Eritrea claim that they are a separate ethnic group from the Tigrinya people in the area and consider their native languages to be both Arabic and Tigrinya, and are thus treated as a separate ethno-religious community.

Culture
Tigrayans sometimes described as “individualistic”, due to elements of competition, jealousy and local conflicts. This, however, rather reflects a strong tendency to defend one's own community and local rights against—then widespread—interferences, be it from more powerful individuals or the state. Tigrayans communities are marked by numerous social institutions with a strong networking of character, where relations are based on mutual rights and bonds. Economic and other support is mediated by these institutions. In the urban context, the modern local government have taken over the functions of traditional associations. In most rural areas, however, traditional social organizations are fully in function. All members of such an extended family are linked by strong mutual obligations. Villages are usually perceived as genealogical communities, consisting of several lineages.A remarkable heritage of Tigrayans are their customary laws. In Tigray, customary law is also still partially practiced to some degree even in political self-organization and penal cases. It is also of great importance for conflict resolution.

Cuisine 

Tigrayans food characteristically consists of vegetable and often very spicy meat dishes, usually in the form of tsebhi, a thick stew, served atop injera, a large sourdough flatbread. As the vast majority of Tigrayans belong to the Ethiopian Orthodox Church (and the minority Muslims), pork is not consumed because of religious beliefs. Meat and dairy products are not consumed on Wednesdays and Fridays, and also during the seven compulsory fasts. Because of this reason, many vegan meals are present. Eating around a shared food basket, mäsob is a custom in the Tigray region and is usually done so with families and guests. The food is eaten using no cutlery, using only the fingers (of the right hand) and sourdough flatbread to grab the contents on the bread.

Regional dishes 
T'ihlo (ṭïḥlo) is a dish originating from the historical Agame and Akkele Guzai provinces. The dish is unique to these parts of both countries, but is now slowly spreading throughout the entire region. T'ihlo is made using moistened roasted barley flour that is kneaded to a certain consistency. The dough is then broken into small ball shapes and is laid out around a bowl of spicy meat stew. A two-pronged wooden fork is used to spear the ball and dip it into the stew. The dish is usually served with mes, a type of honey wine.

Genetics
Kumar, H R S et al. (2020), showed that Tigray samples from Northern Ethiopia had (~50%) of a genetic component shared with Europeans and Middle Eastern Populations.

Notable people

Meles Zenawi – Former Prime Minister of Ethiopia
Rophnan – musician
Abraham Belay - Minister of National Defense
Yohannes IV - Emperor of Ethiopia born in Tembien, Ethiopian Empire
Debretsion Gebremichael – Governor of Tigray.
Gebrehiwot Baykedagn –  was an Ethiopian doctor, economist, and intellectual.
Sebhat Gebre-Egziabher – Ethiopian writer
Tewolde Berhan Gebre Egziabher – world-renowned environmental scientist
Kinfe Abraham – Founder of Ethiopian Institute of Peace and former president of Horn of Africa Democracy and Development
Gebregziabher Gebremariam – runner who won 5 times in the World Cross Country Championships
Werknesh Kidane – runner who won a gold medal in the 2003 World Cross Country Championships
Abeba Aregawi – runner and gold medalist of world, world indoor and European indoor
Tsgabu Gebremaryam Grmay – road cyclist one time African time trial champion
Siye Abraha – leading the UN Development Programme's security sector reform in Liberia
Abune Mathias –  "His Holiness Abune Mathias I, Sixth Patriarch and Catholicos of Ethiopia, Archbishop of Axum and Ichege of the See of Saint Taklehaimanot.
Tedros Adhanom – The Director General of World Health Organization
Arkebe Oqubay - is a senior Ethiopian politician, a Minister and Special Advisor to the former Prime Minister of Ethiopia, Hailemariam Desalegn.
Gebrehiwot Baykedagn – was one of the pioneer Ethiopian doctor, economist, and intellectual.
Fisseha Desta – Vice President of Ethiopia
Atse Baeda Maryam – Atse a pretender, son of Ras Mikael Sehul
Mikael Sehul – Ras of Ethiopia
Haile Selassie Gugsa – Dejazmatch from Ethiopia
Wolde Selassie- Ras of Ethiopia
Ras Alula (Abba Nega) – 19th Century Ras of Ethiopia
Ras Mengesha Yohannes – Ras of Tigray.
Hayelom Araya – Ethiopian General of the army
Miruts Yifter – athlete who won two gold medals in the 1980 Moscow Olympics
Abune Paulos – Former Patriarch of the Ethiopian Orthodox Tewahedo Church.
Kiros Alemayehu - Kiros was a prolific songwriter and singer. He popularized Tigrigna songs through his albums to the non-Tigrinya speaking Ethiopians.
Eyasu Berhe - was an Ethiopian singer, writer, producer and poet, as well as a member of the Tigray People's Liberation Front (TPLF).
Dawit Kebede -winner of the 2010 CPJ International Press Freedom Award.
Freweini Mebrahtu -2019 CNN Hero of the Year
Zeresenay Alemseged -is Tigrayan paleoanthropologist who was the Chair of the Anthropology Department at the California Academy of Sciences in San Francisco, United States. 
 Abebe Fekadu- Tigrayan Australian powerlifter.

Notes

References

Bibliography
 
 

Tigray Region
Ethnic groups in Ethiopia